The 1994 Argentine motorcycle Grand Prix was the penultimate round of the 1994 Grand Prix motorcycle racing season. It took place on 25 September 1994 at the Autódromo Oscar Alfredo Gálvez in Buenos Aires.

500 cc classification

250 cc classification

125 cc classification

References

Argentine Republic motorcycle Grand Prix
Argentine
Motorcycle Grand Prix